Katselovo is a village in northern Bulgaria, administered by the municipality of Dve Mogili and part of Ruse Province. It lies 35 km south of Ruse on the southern edge of the Rusenski Lom Nature Park, and 16 km southeast of Dve Mogili. The village begins on the bank of the Cherni Lom river which joins with the Beli Lom to produce the Rusenski Lom which flows into the River Danube near Ruse, and rises very steeply to a high limestone plateau. The distance from the Bulgarian capital, Sofia, is 241.144 km.

Katselovo is 18 km south of the UNESCO World Heritage Listed monasteries and churches of Ivanovo and is located on edge of the same steep limestone escarpment. The road from the valley floor to the top of the escarpment has many hairpin turns. In former times it was a hive of economic activity but is now mainly a farming community, the textile factory and other industries having closed down due to the economic difficulties during the headlong rush from socialism to a free market economy after the Bulgarian Communist Party was renamed in 1990.

One of the major employers is the cooperative "Hope - Katselovo", who grow large quantities of wheat, maize and sunflowers. The credit cooperative "Oral" continues to play a large part in the village economy as it has done for over 100 years. Most of the residents have large gardens in which they grow vegetables and many keep a cow, goats, sheep or other livestock along with chickens, geese, ducks and turkeys. The fish ponds near the river are used to rear carp for the table.

In 1980 there were 550 houses, 26 of which were empty. 49 houses had only one occupant and 76 houses had two elderly people in. 106 houses had two young people and 293 houses had three or more people living in them. However the population has shrunk considerably in recent years.

Due to the declining population, the village school was closed down in 2007 and the children now travel by bus to attend school in Dve Mogili. There are several shops and restaurants in the village, along with a post office and a bakery which produces fresh bread six days a week. There is also a street / livestock market on Sundays which is well attended, Katselovo claims to breed the finest horses in the area and are justly proud of this.

There is a library, cultural center and cinema between the school and the church, opposite the Mayor's office / Town (village) Hall. The village has a twice daily bus service to Ruse via Dve Mogili. Fuel, (petrol, diesel and LPG) is supplied at the filling station at the top of the hill and at the cooperative Надежда. The nearest railway station is at Dve Mogili and the nearest functioning airports are at Varna, (150 km) or Henri Coandă International Airport and Aurel Vlaicu International Airport serving Bucharest across the Danube in Romania, (100 km). There is also a British ex-pat community.

During the Ottoman occupation, Katselovo was the largest village in the area and the church there was used for marriages and baptisms. The present church was built in 1862. There are three cemeteries, one of which is from the early Ottoman period and hasn't been used for a few hundred years, the present cemetery is not very old and was a replacement for the previous one which is full. The area around Katselovo is rich in history, there are several neolithic mounds. Roman remains, Macedonian, Thracian, Byzantine and Roman imperial coins have been found nearby too.

In 2002, Stoyan Vitanov wrote a very interesting book about Katselovo, entitled Village Katselovo, detailing the history of the village. It tells of the village's involvement in the struggle for independence at the end of the 19th century, the forming of the first cooperatives and their subsequent evolution, how the village held several records in former times for its agricultural production and other interesting facts about Katselovo. It also contains some photographs of the village from the recent past but unfortunately for English readers this has only been published in Bulgarian.

On 24 August 1877, between Gorsko Ablanovo and Katselovo there was a major battle of the Russo-Turkish war of 1877-78. The Ottoman forces commanded by Mehmed Ali Pasha and Sabit Pasha, consisted of about 27,000 soldiers, 50 cannons with reserves of 12,500 soldiers and 31 guns and outnumbered the Russian troops commanded by Crown Prince Alexander Alexandrovich, Lieutenant-General Pyotr Vannovsky and Major-General Alexei Timofeev who had 10 battalions and 50 guns. The Ottoman army won the battle but not the war. The Russian losses were 1301 killed and wounded, the Ottoman losses are unknown.

Eventually the area was liberated from Ottoman control which led to the Treaty of Berlin, which in turn was instrumental in creating the Principality of Bulgaria which, in 1908, officially declared independence and formed the Kingdom of Bulgaria after 512 years of Ottoman rule.

The climate is temperate, with cold snowy winters and hot dry summers.

References

External links
 ПК НАДЕЖДА - СЕЛО КАЦЕЛОВО YouTube Video
 photograph of road into village
 Tourism brochure

Villages in Ruse Province